A Jura hole stone (or Jura Coral rock, or Jura cavity stone) is a natural stone found in the Jura mountains of France. They are light beige in color and have many cavities. They come from the petrified sea deposits caused by tectonic shifts between mountains. The bizarre form and many cavities are caused by erosion over thousands of years.

These stones are protected: it is forbidden to pick them up. However, some are for sale for aquarium decoration.

Gallery

References

External links 

 http://www.zooplus.co.uk/shop/fish/decoration/natural_decoration/natural_rocks/43351

Crystals
Sulfate minerals